Goran Vukošić - Kenzo (Serbian Cyrillic: Горан Вукошић) is a popular Montenegrin turbo-folk singer. He lives in Belgrade, Serbia. His best known hit singles are Isti igrači (Same players), a duet with Mina Kostić, and Mala bez morala (Girl without moral).

Discography 
Album 2003 (2003)
Trenutak slabosti (2006)
Svih ovih godina (2008)

External links 
Official Website

Living people
21st-century Montenegrin male singers
Year of birth missing (living people)
Place of birth missing (living people)